The beach handball competition at the 2022 World Games took place 11–15 July 2022, in Birmingham in United States, at the Sloss Furnaces.
Originally scheduled to take place in July 2021, the Games were rescheduled for July 2022 as a result of the 2020 Summer Olympics postponement due to the COVID-19 pandemic.

Qualification

Men's tournament

Women's tournament

Schedule

Men's tournament

Group A Preliminary round

Group B Preliminary round

Group I Main round

Group II Main Round

Knockout stage

Placement round

Final ranking

Women's tournament

Group A

Knockout stage

5th-place match

Final ranking

Medalists

References

External links
 The World Games 2022
 International Handball Federation
 Results book

 
2022 World Games